Mike Dodd (born April 24, 1971) is a Canadian former soccer player.

Career 
Dodd began playing at the college level in 1989 with Capilano College. In 1991, he was drafted by the Vancouver 86ers of the Canadian Soccer League (CSL), but was loaned to the Winnipeg Fury. In 1992, he signed a contract with Winnipeg and secured the Mita Cup. After the demise of the CSL the Fury joined the Canadian National Soccer League, and he re-signed with Winnipeg. During the 1993 season he was temporarily loaned to the Vancouver 86ers of the American Professional Soccer League. 

In 1994, he permanently signed with Vancouver, and played with them until the 1998 USISL A-League season. In 1998, he was inducted into the Manitoba Sports Hall of Fame and Museum as a member of the 1992 Winnipeg Fury team.

International career  
He made his debut for the Canada men's national under-23 soccer team on May 5, 1991 against Trinidad and Tobago in an Olympic qualifier match.

Honours
Canadian Soccer League: 1
 1992

References 
 

1971 births
Living people
Canadian soccer players
Winnipeg Fury players
Vancouver Whitecaps (1986–2010) players
Canadian Soccer League (1987–1992) players
Canadian National Soccer League players
American Professional Soccer League players
A-League (1995–2004) players
Soccer people from British Columbia
People from North Vancouver
Sportspeople from North Vancouver
Association football midfielders
Canada men's under-23 international soccer players